The 2019 World Table Tennis Championships were held in Budapest, Hungary from 21 to 28 April 2019. It was the 55th edition of the championships, and the fourth time that they were held in Budapest.

Schedule
Five events were contested, with qualification rounds taking place on 21 and 22 April.

Medal summary

Medal table

Medalists

See also
2019 ITTF World Tour
2019 ITTF World Tour Grand Finals
2019 ITTF Men's World Cup
2019 ITTF Women's World Cup
2019 ITTF Team World Cup
2019 World Junior Table Tennis Championships

References

External links
Official website

 
World Table Tennis Championships
World Championships
2019 in Hungarian sport
International sports competitions in Budapest
Table tennis competitions in Hungary
World Table Tennis Championships
2010s in Budapest